Yingkiong is a town in and the administrative headquarters of Upper Siang district in the Northeast Indian state of Arunachal Pradesh. According to the 2011 Census, the town has a total population of 8,573.

History

In 1911, following the Anglo–Abor wars, the British gained administrative control of the Upper Siang region. It was put under the administrative control of the Assistant Political Officer stationed at Sadiya (in Assam) during the period. Some notable British civil servants who held the role of Assistant Political Officer included Jack Francis Needham, appointed in 1882, and Noel Williamson, who was assassinated by the villagers of Komsing in the present day East Siang district.

After the independence of India, the region was part of the East Siang district until 1995, when it was separated for administrative convenience and made an independent district, northwest of Pasighat.

Geography

Yingkiong is characterised by its hilly terrains and river valleys. Tuting, Singging, and Bishing are towns north of Yingkiong, geographically close to the Indo-China border. Simong, Gobuk, Puging, Pangkang, Gette, Moying, Bomdo, Likor, and Millang are some of the villages and hamlets that surround Yingkiong.

Climate
Yingkiong has a relatively warm and humid subtropical climate. The highest recorded temperature in Yingkiong is 39 °C during summer, and 4 °C in winter. The highest recorded annual rainfall of Yingkiong is 3,116 mm. The higher parts of the town receive snowfall for most of the year.

Economy
The majority of Yingkiong people are subsistence farmers. Fruit and vegetable cultivation for commercial sale is endorsed by local administration through MIDH (Mission For Integrated Development of Horticulture), a centrally-sponsored scheme of the Ministry of Agriculture and Farmers' Welfare. Of the 69 per cent of households engaged in agriculture in Upper Siang, the Yingkiong township has the highest number of urban agrarian households.

Jhum cultivation (slash and burn) and terrace farming are the most common farming techniques. Rice, maize, and millet are the main food crops. Cash crops like turmeric and sugarcane are commonly grown.

Cultivation of seasonal fruits like oranges and pineapple is common, and during periods of favourable cultivation and surplus output, they are transported in bulk for sale in local markets or outside the town in Pasighat. Pisciculture is also common and is promoted under a centrally sponsored FFDA (Fish Farmer Development Agency) programme to generate employment for locals and revenue for the state.

A variety of black tea called Siang Tea is made at the Deki Tea estate in Ramsing Village for export and domestic consumption.

Handicrafts such as woven bamboo stools known as murha are often seen. The Adi tribe are known for making a distinct type of traditional basket called egin, which is used frequently by the locals to carry household items like rice, dried wood, and other edibles or farm products.

Demographics
According to the 2011 Census of India, the town had a total population of 8,573: there were 4,381 males and 4,192 females. There were 1,139 persons aged 0 to 6. The total working population was 3,787, with the male working population at 2,221 and the female working population at 1,566. It has a non-working population of 4,786 persons, mostly of dependent age.

The literacy rate of the region is 64%. The female literacy rate is 44.89% and the male literacy rate is 55%.

Adi is the primary dialect spoken in the area. Hindi is commonly used as a lingua franca.

Culture

Festivals
The locals of Yingkiong celebrate the Solung, Aran (Unying-Aran), Etor, Siang River Darshan, and Mopin festivals.

The Solung festival revolves around agriculture and celebrates good harvest. The festival is generally celebrated mid-August–September: a proper date for the festival is fixed by a village council called the kebang or by the gam (village headman) each year. On the day of the festival , villagers prepare apong (local rice wine). Fresh vegetables and meats are stored for the occasion.
Aran (Unying Aran) is a new year festival of the Adi community celebrated in the districts of East and Upper Siang. It marks the arrival of the spring. During the festival, male elders of the village perform the Bari dance, and young boys and girls perform the Yakjong dance, which narrate the origins of the festival. They also pray for the good health and prosperity of the people.
The Etor festival is celebrated on May 15 by Adi tribes in East and Upper Siang. Etor means 'fencing' in local dialect and therefore it is related to the protection of crops by fencing the cultivated lands and protecting gayal (Mithun) inside large fields. A huge feast is held and offerings are made to deities. Etor marks the beginning of the annual agricultural cycle of the community.
The Siang River festival was previously known as the Brahmaputra Darshan Festival. After 2005, Yingkiong, Tuting, and Pasighat were chosen as the places to conduct the festival.

Transport
The town is connected to the rest of the country and Arunachal Pradesh via National Highway 513 (NH-513) and NH-52 from Pasighat (126 km) to Itanagar (392 km). Modes of transport include taxi and Arunachal Pradesh State Transport bus services.

In January 2019,  Byorung Bridge, a 300-meter long cable stayed suspension foot-bridge, was constructed over the Siang river . The bridge connects the town of Tuting on the eastern bank to the road to Tuting-Gelling on the western bank, reducing 40 km in travel distance for 20,000 residents of nearby villages.

Earlier aerial connectivity was limited to Mohanbari Airport in Dibrugarh. In 2018, Pasighat Airport was built and made operational in Pasighat town, which is currently the nearest airport to reach Yingkiong. There is direct aerial connectivity to Yingkiong through the helicopter services that are available from Pasighat, Itanagar, and Assam. There are two heliports in the town: one near Siang and the other across from the District Collector office in Yingkiong that facilitates helicopter landing services.

The nearest railway station is 165 km south at Murkongselek in the Jonai District of Assam, connecting Yingkiong via Pasighat.

COVID-19
The town has confirmed multiple cases of COVID-19. Among them was a student returnee from the National Capital Region and the Health and Family Welfare Minister of Arunachal Pradesh who is a native of Yingkiong. The town does not have a COVID-19 testing lab facility.

Notable people
 Gegong Apang
 Alo Libang

References

External links
https://uppersiang.nic.in/
http://arunachaltp.nic.in/yingkiong.html

Cities and towns in Upper Siang district